Disney Princess: Enchanting Storybooks is an art-based video game published by Disney Interactive Studios and developed by THQ that players can play on the uDraw GameTablet for the Nintendo Wii. The game is based on various princesses from Disney animated films, including Ariel, Belle, Jasmine, Cinderella, Rapunzel, and Tiana. It was released on November 15, 2011 for the Nintendo Wii and Nintendo DS.

Designed as a single-player or multi-player game for all ages, Disney Princess: Enchanting Storybooks lets players restore the pages of each Disney princesses storybooks by completing drawing and painting activities using the uDraw GameTablet. Opal, the Keeper of Color, guides players as they complete coloring books from the six Disney Princess characters. There are over 100 coloring book pages, which are unlocked as players move along in the game. Special activities include number painting, sticker design, musical tune-up, and more. The uDraw GameTablet is bundled with another art-based video game, uDraw Studio Instant Artist, allowing players to familiarize themselves with the tablet and stylus pen, as well as how to color and draw before playing.

Gameplay
Designed as a single or multi-player game for all ages, players use the uDraw GameTablet and stylus pen in various activities. The game introduces a brand new character Opal, the Keeper of Color, who is a fairy in charge of coloring the magical kingdoms. This time, Opal's spell has backfired and she has removed all the color. Players must help restore color back to the magical kingdoms from The Little Mermaid, Beauty and the Beast, Cinderella, Aladdin, The Princess and the Frog, and Tangled. This is also the first appearance of Rapunzel in a Disney video game.

Because of the unique features of the uDraw GameTablet, artists can use these features to help complete the coloring books, such as number-painting, tilt-painting, and coloring book pages that narrate the Disney fairy tales out loud. As players progress, they unlock more than 100 coloring books, as well as six tools specific to each Disney Princess, such as Belle's Rose Petal crayon or Rapunzel's watercolor brush.

Other fun types of game play include Magic Search, Make a Melody, and Spot the Differences, plus sticker books and musical tune-up, all which keep in the tradition of the stories and characters from the Disney animated feature films.

References

External links
 Official uDraw GameTablet site
 Official Wii site

2011 video games
Disney Princess
Nintendo DS games
Page 44 Studios games
Single-player video games
THQ games
Video games developed in the United States
Video games scored by Adam Gubman
Wii games